Hacıqazma (also, Hajigazma and Hajygazma) is a village in the Khachmaz District of Azerbaijan. The village forms part of the municipality of Ahmedoba.

References 

Populated places in Khachmaz District